Puffin Books, the children's imprint of the British publisher Penguin Books, made alternations to various works by British author Roald Dahl in 2023, sparking controversy.

Dahl has received criticism for anti-Israeli comments and his use of racial and sexist stereotypes. Reviewing Australian author Tony Clifton's God Cried, a picture book about the siege of West Beirut during the 1982 Lebanon War, Dahl used several antisemitic tropes, including claiming that the United States was "dominated by Jewish financial institutions". Following Dahl's death in 1990, multiple works of his were examined further, including Charlie and the Chocolate Factory, The Witches, and Dahl's short story collection Switch Bitch. Dahl's comments received renewed attention in the years leading up to the controversy, with his family issuing an apology for his comments in 2020.

In February 2023, Puffin Books hired sensitivity readers to assess Dahl's works, rereleasing his work with multiple changes regarding Dahl's depiction of race, sex, and character. A report from British newspaper The Telegraph determined that Puffin Books altered hundreds of words and phrases used in Dahl's work, including Charlie and the Chocolate Factory, Matilda, George's Marvellous Medicine, James and the Giant Peach, and Fantastic Mr Fox. On 23 February, Puffin Books announced that Dahl's original publications would be released as the "The Roald Dahl Classic Collection"

Various authors, politicians, and organisations have provided commentary on the controversy. Following Puffin Books' announcement, Ian Fleming Publications announced that Ian Fleming's James Bond series would receive a similar rerelease, removing racist language and depictions.

Background

Roald Dahl was a British author of children's literature. Dahl's works are published by Puffin Books, the children's imprint of the British publisher Penguin Books, while the rights to his works are managed by the Roald Dahl Story Company. In September 2021, streaming service Netflix acquired the Roald Dahl Story Company.

Dahl's comments and writing have received criticism. In the August 1983 issue of the Literary Review, a review by Dahl of Tony Clifton's God Cried appears, in which he writes that the United States is "so utterly dominated by the great Jewish financial institutions" and asks, "must Israel, like Germany, be brought to her knees before she learns how to behave in this world?" In a 1990 interview with The Independent, Dahl described himself as antisemitic and referenced the "Jews control the media" antisemitic trope.

Characters in Dahl's works have been criticised for perceived racist and sexist stereotypes. In 1972, children's book author Eleanor Cameron compared the Oompa-Loompas in Charlie and the Chocolate Factory to African slaves in an article for The Horn Book Magazine. These statements were echoed further following Dahl's death in 1990, with book critic Michael Dirda accusing Charlie and the Chocolate Factory and The Witches of racism and misogyny, respectively, in an article for The Washington Post. In the Jewish-American and feminist publication Lilith, Michele Landsberg argued that "evil, domineering, smelly, fat, ugly women are [Dahl's] favorite villains". Dahl's short story collection Switch Bitch was criticised for its crude and disturbing themes. In 1973, Dahl rewrote Oompa-Loompas, making them white in skin color. In 2020, Dahl's family apologised for his antisemitic comments.

Revisions

Initial revisions
On 19 February 2023, Puffin Books announced that it would be altering the language used in many of Dahl's books to remove derogatory words. The process took approximately three years, and was conducted in association with Inclusive Minds, a collective that promotes accessibility and inclusivity. A report from British newspaper The Telegraph found hundreds of removed or altered words and phrases. In one such instance in the children's novel Esio Trot, a sentence calling the tortoises in the book "backwards" was removed.

Original collection
On 23 February, Puffin Books announced "The Roald Dahl Classic Collection", consisting of Dahl's original texts. The altered versions will continue to be sold.

Aftermath

Digital copies
Following the announcement, e-book copies of Dahl's works were automatically updated.

Criticism of sensitivity readers

Puffin Books' use of sensitivity readers to determine potentially offensive words or phrases renewed criticism of sensitivity readers as a whole; the use of sensitivity readers in the industry has increased following the murder of George Floyd in 2020. British poet Kate Clanchy, whose memoir Some Kids I Taught and What They Taught Me was edited by sensitivity readers, wrote an essay in The Times in response to Puffin Books' revisions criticising sensitivity readers.

Reactions

Authors
British-American novelist Salman Rushdie criticised the rewrites in a tweet, writing that "Puffin Books and the Dahl estate should be ashamed". Suzanne Nossel, the CEO of PEN America, spoke on behalf of the organisation to condemn Puffin Books' changes. In contrast, Joanne Harris, chair of the Society of Authors, praised the revisions. English writer Philip Pullman suggested that Dahl's work should fade away in favor of authors such as Malorie Blackman.

Politicians
Prime Minister Rishi Sunak, referencing The BFG, stated that Puffin Books should not "gobblefunk around with [Dahl's] words". Similarly, former Prime Minister Boris Johnson recited "Augustus Gloop" from Charlie and the Chocolate Factory (2005) and referenced Thomas Bowdler's republishing of William Shakespeare's work.

Contemporary critics
Several journalists have written op-eds on the controversy. The Atlantics Helen Lewis used Dahl's novel My Uncle Oswald—known for its vulgarity, sexism, and themes of eugenics—to state that grotesque description of people is rooted within Dahl's work, and as such cannot be omitted, describing the revisions as "corporate safetyism". In a differing opinion, Matthew Walter of The Lamp viewed the controversy as insignificant, comparing the release of the collection to New Coke and Coca-Cola Classic.

Camilla, Queen Consort was reportedly "shocked and dismayed" upon hearing about the revisions. English comedian Ricky Gervais poked fun at the changes in a tweet.

Legacy
On 26 February 2023, Ian Fleming Publications announced that Ian Fleming's James Bond series would receive several revisions, including removing racial slurs and a racist depiction of African Americans in Live and Let Die, following a review from sensitivity reviewers.

See also
Culture war

References

Roald Dahl
Literature controversies